"Damaged" is a song by American girl group Danity Kane. It was written by Justin Walker, Sean Combs, Mario Winans, Jonathan Yip, Edward Logan, Jeremy Reeves, Micayle McKinney, Ray Romulos, Shannon "Slam" Lawrence, Rose Marie Tan, and James Smith. The song was produced by the Stereotypes, with additional production from Combs and Winans, for the band's second studio album, Welcome to the Dollhouse (2008).

Released as the album's lead single on November 20, 2007, in the United States, the song reached number 10 on the US Billboard Hot 100, where it became the band's second top-10 hit. In addition, "Damaged" reached the top 30 on the Canadian Hot 100, their first song to chart there. In 2017, Billboard ranked the song number 38 on their list of the "100 Greatest Girl Group Songs of All Time".

Commercial performance
The song was released to legal digital download sites on November 27, 2007, in the United States. It reached the top ten in the US and Ukraine.

Music video
The music video for "Damaged" was directed by Syndrome and premiered on March 11, 2008, on MTV's TRL, where it peaked at number 3 on its countdown. In its entirety it premiered  on MTV.com. The video also premiered as the 'New Joint' on BET's 106 & Park on March 20, 2008. The song peaked at No. 6.

The video features the members of Danity Kane in a futuristic theme. The pink special effects are used to represent the setting of being within an actual heart. Throughout the video, choreography is done along with the music and the girls are shown in a futuristic room with screens of them performing the choreography, which they see while laying down on a futuristic bed. Towards the end of the music video, the beds that the girls are lying on close to form a heart, which happens to be the heart of a man on a stretcher in a hospital. Medical staff, who turn out to be the members of Danity Kane, try to revive him. The music video then transitions to a setting where the man is in his bedroom with a note on him saying "Tired of the damage – DK".

Awards

Formats and track listings
Australian single
 "Damaged" (album version) – 4:06
 "Damaged" (Global Factory Radio Edit) – 3:25
 "Damaged" (DJ Richie Rich X-Mix Remix) – 4:21

US "Dance Mixes" digital release
 "Damaged" (Friscia & Lamboy Club Mix) – 9:05
 "Damaged" (Global Factory Mix Club Mix) – 7:49
 "Damaged" (DJ Richie Rich X-Mix Remix) – 4:21
 "Damaged" (Friscia & Lamboy Radio Edit) – 4:44
 "Damaged" (Global Factory Radio Edit) – 3:25
 "Damaged" (Friscia & Lamboy Dub) – 8:55
 "Damaged" (Friscia & Lamboy Club Mix No. 2) – 6:33

US "Urban Remixes" digital release
 "Damaged" (Remix featuring Fabolous) – 4:07
 "Damaged" (Remix featuring Gorilla Zoe) – 4:08
 "Damaged" (Remix featuring Fabolous) (clean version) – 4:07
 "Damaged" (Remix featuring Gorilla Zoe) (clean version) – 4:08

Charts

Weekly charts

Year-end charts

Certifications

Release history

References

2008 singles
2008 songs
Danity Kane songs
Bad Boy Records singles
Songs written by Sean Combs
Songs written by Mario Winans
Songs written by Micayle McKinney
Song recordings produced by the Stereotypes
Songs written by Jonathan Yip
Songs written by Ray Romulus
Songs written by Jeremy Reeves